Georgios Katsifaras (1935, Kalentzi – August 8, 2012) was a Greek politician. He was Minister for Mercantile Marine from 1982 to 1985, and Minister for Trade in 1986. Katsifaras died in Athens on August 8, 2012, aged 77.

References

1935 births
2012 deaths
Government ministers of Greece
PASOK politicians
MPs of Achaea
Ministers for Mercantile Marine of Greece
People from Achaea